Potrero de Caña is a corregimiento in Tolé District, Chiriquí Province, Panama. Its population as of 1990 was 1,751; its population as of 2000 was 458.

References

Corregimientos of Chiriquí Province